HMS Carisbrooke Castle (K379) was one of 44 s built for the Royal Navy during World War II.

Design and description
The Castle-class corvette was a stretched version of the preceding Flower class, enlarged to improve seakeeping and to accommodate modern weapons. They were powered by a pair of triple-expansion steam engines, each driving one propeller shaft using steam provided by two Admiralty three-drum boilers. The ships' complement was 99 officers and ratings.

The Castle-class ships were equipped with a single QF  Mk XVI gun forward, but their primary weapon was their single three-barrel Squid anti-submarine mortar. This was backed up by one depth charge rail and two throwers for 15 depth charges. The ships were fitted with two twin and a pair of single mounts for  Oerlikon light AA guns. Provision was made for a further four single mounts if needed. They were equipped with Type 145Q and Type 147B ASDIC sets to detect submarines by reflections from sound waves beamed into the water. A Type 277 search radar and a HF/DF radio direction finder rounded out the Castles' sensor suite.

Construction and career
Carisbrooke Castle was laid down by Caledon Shipbuilding & Engineering Company at their shipyard at Dundee on 12 March 1943 and launched on 31 July. She was completed on 17 November and served as a convoy escort until the end of the war in May 1945. The ship was assigned to the Fishery Protection Flotilla based at Devonport in April 1946, but was reduced to reserve later that year.

After the Second World War, her career was spent in the fleet reserve until May 1952, when she became part of the Second Training Squadron at Portland where she remained until 1956. In 1953, she took part in the Fleet Review to celebrate the Coronation of Queen Elizabeth II. She featured in the BBC short docufilm A Brief Journey - sailor's run ashore in 1954 to Plymouth, Dartmoor and Looe. The ship was sold and arrived at Faslane on 14 June 1958 to be broken up.

References

Bibliography
 
 
 
 
 

 

Castle-class corvettes
Ships built in Dundee
1943 ships